This list comprises all players who participated in at least one league match for Cleveland Internationals since the team's first season in the USL Premier Development League in 2004 until their last in 2010. Players who were on the roster but never played a first team game are not listed; players who appeared for the team in other competitions (US Open Cup, etc.) but never actually made a USL appearance are noted at the bottom of the page where appropriate.

A
  Aaron Adkins
  Todd Alexander

B
  Kevin Balkanloo
  Jacob Banas
  Danny Bartulovic
  Christopher Binder
  Cameron Boyd
  Mitch Boyer
  Elliot Bradbrook
  Jon Brickman
  Marc Burch
  Evan Bush

C
  Rhys Cannella
  Patrick Coleman
  Oliver Condell
  Carl Contrasciere
  Dan Cooperider
  Brian Cothern
  Mike Crane

D
  Matt Dagilis
  Nathan Darr
  George Davis
  Jeff Demarchi
  Matthew Demarchi
  Anthony Dibello
  Brian Donovan
  Christopher Dore
  Tony Dore

E
  Allan Eller

F
  Alexander Fatovic
  Braden Fleak
  Manuel Conde Fuentes

G
  Sam Galloway
  Steve Gillespie
  Johnny Grebenc
  Chris Green
  Ryan Greenhill
  Shawn Gross
  Josh Grossman

H
  Jordan Haggit
  Ryan Hall
  Nick Harpel
  Bryan Henson
  Zachary Hiltner
  Matt Horth
  Christian Huelsman

J
  Cameron Jordan
  Mario Jurcic

K
  Steve Kane
  Byron Kaverman
  George Kephart
  Justin Kibler
  Rick King Jr.
  Dustin Kirby
  William Kletzien
  Matthew Kmetz
  Thoms Kolba Jr.
  Chris Korb
  Chris Koy

L
  Tony Labudovski
  Zack Lewis
  Chris Loughlin
  Sam Luffy

M
  David Maier
  Justin Mancine
  Mike Mangotic
  Phil Mansell
  Michael Marich
  Geoff Marsh
  Lucas Martorana
  Matthew Mason
  Mike Matlock
  Shakir McCoy
  Devin McKenney
  Judson McKinney
  Aasund Michalsen
  Nathaniel Milhoan
  Jared Miller
  Ryan Minick
  Dejan Mladenovic
  Joe Moore
  Justin Morrow
  Danny Mortemore
  Vlad Muresan
  Abrim Mueller
  Patrick Murray
  Yoram Mwila

N
  Darlington Nagbe
  Joe Nagbe
  Michael Nanchoff
  Mark Nerkowski
  Jacob Naumann
  Martin Nesic
  Kevin Nugent

O
  Michael O'Neill
  Kwame Oduro
  Stefan Ostergren
  Richard Ott

P
  Nicholas Parianos
  Kevin Pitorak
  Anthony Ponikvar
  Matthew Preyss

R
  Adam Ross

S
  John Sand
  Kyle Scharfenberg
  Jacob Schramm
  Jason Scudamore
  Wesley Sechrist
  Wally Senk
  Corey Sipos
  Todd Skelton
  Jake Slemker
  Felipe Souza
  Adam Spanbauer
  Ben Speas
  Dustin Stelmak
  Ryan Sterba
  Robert Strachan
  Brad Stuver
  Admir Suljevic

T
  Nick Thompson
  Andrew Tipton
  Matt Tutich

U
  Sinisa Ubiparipovic
  Slavisa Ubiparipovic
  Adam Urban

V
  Carlin Vandendriessche
  Zach Varga
  Mike Vessells
  Marko Vucic

W
  Greg Walter
  Jordan Webb
  Josh Westermann
  Jason Whitehead
  Thomas Whittaker
  Josh Williams
  Kiki Willis

Z
  Steve Zakuani
  Ben Zemanski
  Derek Zuniga

Sources

2010 Cleveland Internationals stats
2009 Cleveland Internationals stats
2008 Cleveland Internationals stats
2007 Cleveland Internationals stats
2006 Cleveland Internationals stats
2005 Cleveland Internationals stats

References

Cleveland Internationals
 
Association football player non-biographical articles